Liga Deportiva Universitaria de Quito's 1983 season was the club's 53rd year of existence, the 30th year in professional football and the 23rd in the top level of professional football in Ecuador.

Kits
Supplier: AdidasSponsor(s): Banco Popular

Competitions

Serie A

First stage

Results

Second stage

Results

References

RSSSF - 1983 Serie A

External links

Official Site 
LDU Quito (3) - D. Quito (0)
D. Quito (4) - LDU Quito (4)

1983